Mercy Ima Macjoe,  born June 20, 1993, better known as Mercy Macjoe, is a Nigerian actress, film producer, and entrepreneur. She was born and raised in Lagos but hails from Akwa Ibom State. Mercy is best known for her roles in Magdalene and Jenna, which earned her prestigious awards. Ima Macjoe, professionally credited as Mercy Macjoe is a Nigerian actress, film producer and entrepreneur. She is best known for her roles in Jenna and Magdalene. In 2018, she was nominated for the Best Supporting Actress award at the City People Awards and received the award for Best Independent Short Film at the Hollywood and African Prestigious Awards in 2019.

Early life
Her father, who died when she was very young, leaving her to be raised primarily by her mother, was a soldier from Eket in Akwa Ibom state. Macjoe attended the Nigerian Open University, where she studied Mass Communication for her second degree.

Career

Acting
Mercy Macjoe began her film career in 2011, with a role in the movie Lonely Princess alongside veteran actor Mercy Johnson. She has since then had feature roles the movies Midnight Crew, Zenith of Love, Shame, Bread of Life, Girl Next Door and Flaws. Early in her career, Macjoe featured in a considerable number of Ghanaian movie productions. In 2018 her performance as a tomboy in the movie Jenna received rave reviews and attention from fans and critics alike. In 2020 Macjoe enrolled at the New York Film Academy.

Production
In 2018, she began producing her own feature films with the production of Red, which premiered on Ibaka TV, featuring Nonso Diobi, Ifeanyi Kalu and Macjoe in a lead role. In 2019 she produced three feature films, 30 and Single, shot in London, Love in a Puff and Passion’s Promise.

Awards and recognition

Filmography

Selected filmography

Jenna
Midnight Crew
Zenith of Love
Shame
Bread of Life
Girl Next Door
Flaws
Magdalene
Red
Obsessed alongside Daniel K Daniel
Wedding Eve
Forbidden Pleasure
Somewhere in Hell
Body of a Virgin
Moonwalker
Bonded by Fate

References 

21st-century Nigerian actresses
1993 births
Living people
Nigerian businesspeople
Nigerian film actresses
Nigerian film directors
Nigerian film producers
Actresses from Akwa Ibom State